The enzyme deacetylipecoside synthase (EC 4.3.3.4) catalyzes the chemical reaction

deacetylipecoside + H2O  dopamine + secologanin

This enzyme belongs to the family of lyases, specifically amine lyases, which cleave carbon-nitrogen bonds.  The systematic name of this enzyme class is deacetylipecoside dopamine-lyase (secologanin-forming). This enzyme is also called deacetylipecoside dopamine-lyase.  It participates in indole and ipecac alkaloid biosynthesis.

References

 

EC 4.3.3
Enzymes of unknown structure